Neil Scarisbrick (born 6 June 1970) is a British bobsledder. He competed in the two man and the four man events at the 2002 Winter Olympics.

References

External links
 

1970 births
Living people
British male bobsledders
Olympic bobsledders of Great Britain
Bobsledders at the 2002 Winter Olympics
People from Devizes